The Chugrum is a river in Perm Krai, Russia, a right tributary of the Utva, which in turn is a tributary of the Veslyana.

References

Rivers of Perm Krai